The Packet is the name of several newspapers.

The Columbus Packet, published in Columbus, Mississippi, US
The Falmouth Packet, published in Falmouth, Cornwall, UK
Packet Newspapers, publishers of several newspapers based in Cornwall, UK